A kibitka (from the Arabic "kubbat" - dome) is a pastoralist yurt of late-19th-century Kyrgyz and Kazakh nomads.

The word also refers to a Russian type of carriage or sleigh.

The kibitka uses the same equipage as the troika but, unlike the troika, is larger and usually closed. In Russian literature and folklore, kibitka is a term used mainly for Gypsy wagons. During the Russian Empire, its use to deport disgraced noblemen led to the German-language term kibitkenjustiz ("kibitka justice").

See also
Combined driving
Driving (horse)
Horse harness
Horse-drawn vehicle
Prisoner transport vehicle
Troika

Sources

Horse driving
Russian inventions
Carriages